The Carretera Austral (CH-7, in English: Southern Way) is the name given to Chile's Route 7.

Carretera Austral provides road access to Chile's Aysén Region and southern parts of Los Lagos Region. These areas are sparsely populated and despite its length, Carretera Austral provides access to only about 100,000 people. The largest city along the entire road is Coyhaique with a population of 44,850 in 2002.

History

Construction of the highway was commenced in 1976 under the dictatorship of Augusto Pinochet in order to connect a number of remote communities. Before that, in the 1950s and 1970s, there had been unsuccessful attempts to build access roads in the region. It is among the most ambitious infrastructure projects developed in Chile during the 20th century.

As it was constructed during the military dictatorship, the Carretera Austral bears the unofficial name of the Augusto Pinochet highway.

Carretera Austral has a strategic meaning due to the difficult access by land to a significant portion of Chile's southern territory. This area is characterized by thick forests, fjords, glaciers, canals and steep mountains. Access by sea and air is also a complex task due to extreme winter weather conditions. For decades, most of the land transportation had to cross the border to Argentina in order to reach again Chile's Patagonia. These difficulties were deepened during the 1970s due to the Beagle Conflict crisis. In order to strengthen the Chilean presence in these isolated territories and ensure the land connection to the rest of the country, the government planned the construction of this road, which was executed by the Chilean Army's Engineering Command. More than 10,000 soldiers worked on its construction.

The highway opened to traffic in 1988, and by 1996 was completed to Puerto Yungay. The last  to Villa O'Higgins were opened in 2000. In 2003, a branch road to Caleta Tortel was finished.

Places along the highway
Puerto Montt
Reloncaví Sound
Chamiza Wetland
Contao
Hornopirén (Río Negro)
Hornopirén National Park
Yelcho Lake
Pumalín Park
Chaitén
Queulat National Park
Coyhaique
Balmaceda
Río Ibáñez
Cerro Castillo
General Carrera Lake
Cochrane
Baker River
Confluence of the Baker River and the Nef River
Patagonia Park
Caleta Tortel
Villa O'Higgins

Ferry crossings
Traveling the entire route requires the use of three ferry services, :
This ferry service runs 24/7 with departures every 30 minutes approx. in the day (at night the activity decreases). During the summer (Dec–Feb) the number of departures is increased with boardings every 15, 30 and 45 minutes; the boarding is in order of arrival for passengers, vehicles, motorcycles and bikes. Tickets are available at the waiting line, where personal will approach the vehicle. Check prices and schedules on the ferry's website: www.transportesdelestuario.cl. Passengers without vehicle can board for free during the entire year. Onboard there are restrooms, coffee shops and passengers may walk around the ferry to enjoy the view during the ride.
 a 5-hour crossing from Hornopiren (110 kilometers (68 miles) south of Puerto Montt) to Caleta Gonzalo, which requires passengers to purchase tickets prior to boarding. This can be done online at the site www.taustral.cl where you can also check prices and schedules. On board the ferries there are large passengers' rooms, with coffee shops and restrooms. Passengers can also enjoy the view in the ferry's deck during the ride.
 a 50-minute crossing from Puerto Yungay to Rio Bravo, connecting to the final  of the highway.

Current activity

The highway began as almost entirely unpaved, but more sections are becoming paved each year. As of March 2018, the paved road ends at Villa Cerro Castillo, with roadworks going on just south of there.

There is also a plan to extend the road to Magallanes Region, which still lacks domestic road connection to the rest of Chile. This means constructing a  branch Rio Bravo-Ventisquero Montt-Puerto Natales, with 9 ferry crossings planned.

Gallery

References

External links

 The Route of Parks of Chilean Patagonia - Hornopirén National Park

Roads in Chile
Transport in Aysén Region
Transport in Los Lagos Region
Coasts of Los Lagos Region